Matthew Teggart (born 8 January 1996) is an Irish racing cyclist, formerly of AC Bisontine, who currently rides for UCI Continental team WiV SunGod.

Major results
2017
 9th Overall An Post Rás
1st Stage 3
2018
 10th Overall Paris–Arras Tour
2021
 1st Shay Elliott Memorial Race
2022
 1st  Sprints classification, Tour of Britain
 4th Road race, Commonwealth Games
 4th Paris–Troyes

References

External links

1996 births
Living people
Irish male cyclists
European Games competitors for Ireland
Cyclists at the 2019 European Games